Tragocephala freyi is a species of beetle in the family Cerambycidae. It was described by Brancsik in 1893.

Varietas
 Tragocephala freyi var. oculicollis Fairmaire, 1894
 Tragocephala freyi var. nubeculosa Fairmaire, 1894

References

freyi
Beetles described in 1893